Barun Mukherjee, a politician from All India Forward Bloc, was a Member of the Parliament of India representing West Bengal in the Rajya Sabha, the upper house of the parliament. He was member during April 2006 to 2012 but resigned on 6 May 2008. He was again elected to Rajya Sabha in November 2008 till April 2014.

External links
 Profile on Rajya Sabha website

Living people
All India Forward Bloc politicians
University of Calcutta alumni
1933 births
Rajya Sabha members from West Bengal